Clifton is a village in Chebanse Township, Iroquois County, Illinois, United States. The population was 1,468 at the 2010 census, up from 1,317 at the 2000 census.

History
Clifton was founded in 1857. The village takes its name from the Clifton Hotel in Chicago.

Geography
Clifton is located in northern Iroquois County at  (40.934592, -87.933535). Interstate 57 passes along the eastern side of the village, with access from Exit 297. I-57 leads north  to Kankakee and south  to Champaign.

Demographics

As of the census of 2000, there were 1,317 people, 519 households, and 367 families residing in the village. The racial makeup of the village was 99.16% White, 0.30% Asian, 0.08% Pacific Islander, and 0.46% from two or more races. Hispanic or Latino of any race were 0.53% of the population.

There were 519 households, out of which 34.7% had children under the age of 18 living with them, 59.5% were married couples living together, 9.4% had a female householder with no husband present, and 29.1% were non-families. 26.2% of all households were made up of individuals, and 14.6% had someone living alone who was 65 years of age or older. The average household size was 2.54 and the average family size was 3.09.

In the village, the population was spread out, with 29.0% under the age of 18, 6.0% from 18 to 24, 30.1% from 25 to 44, 20.0% from 45 to 64, and 14.9% who were 65 years of age or older. The median age was 36 years. For every 100 females, there were 90.3 males. For every 100 females age 18 and over, there were 84.8 males.

The median income for a household in the village was $47,216, and the median income for a family was $55,347. Males had a median income of $40,938 versus $25,577 for females. The per capita income for the village was $20,618.  About 2.4% of families and 4.5% of the population were below the poverty line, including 5.3% of those under age 18 and 9.0% of those age 65 or over.

Communications
Clifton is one of three municipalities in Iroquois County (along with Ashkum and Chebanse) that are served by Comcast's South Suburban Chicago system (which is based out of Homewood and also serves the Kankakee area). This means that for local broadcast channels, Clifton receives stations from the Chicago area and does not receive any stations from the Champaign–Springfield–Decatur market, which includes Iroquois County.

References

External links
Village of Clifton official website
The Clifton Advocate, newspaper since 1893

Villages in Iroquois County, Illinois
Villages in Illinois